The 2014 Categoría Primera B season is the 25th season since its founding and is officially called the 2014 Torneo Postobón for sponsorship reasons.

Format
The season consisted of two tournaments: the 'Torneo Apertura' and the 'Torneo Finalización'.
The Apertura tournament will be divided into three stages. The First Stage will be contested on a home-and-away basis, with each team playing the other teams once and playing a regional rival once more. The top eight teams after eighteen rounds will advance to a knockout round, where they will be pitted into four ties to be played on a home-and-away basis, with the four winners advancing to the semifinals and the winner of each semifinal advancing to the final of the tournament, which will be played on a home-and-away basis as well. The winner of this final qualifies for the season final. Meanwhile, the Finalizacion tournament will have a format of eighteen rounds with a round of regional derbies in the ninth round. At the end of the first eighteen rounds, the eight best-placed team will advance to the Semifinal round where teams will be sorted into groups and play a short double Round-robin tournament group stage. The winner of each group will advance to the Final round, which will consist of two legs. The winner will also advance to the season final at the end of the Torneo Finalización, with its winner being promoted to the Categoría Primera A.

Current teams

Torneo Apertura

First stage

Standings

Results

Knockout round bracket

Quarterfinals

Semifinals

Finals

Top goalscorers

Source: Torneo Postobón

Torneo Finalización

First stage

Standings

Results

Semifinals
The Semifinal stage began on November 2 and will end on November 26. The eight teams that advanced were sorted into two groups of four teams. The winner of each group will advance to the finals.

Group A

Group B

Finals

Top goalscorers

Source: Torneo Postobón

Final

Aggregate table

Promotion/relegation playoff 
Quindío, the 2014 Categoría Primera B runner-up, played the second worst team in the Categoría Primera A relegation table, Uniautónoma for a berth in the 2015 Categoría Primera A season. As the Primera A team, Uniautónoma played the second leg at home. The winner was determined by points, followed by goal difference, then a penalty shootout. Uniautónoma defeated Quindío 2–0 on aggregate score and will remain in the top tier for the 2015 season.

References

Categoría Primera B seasons
2014 in Colombian football
Colombia